Leirbotn Church is a parish church of the Church of Norway in Alta Municipality in Troms og Finnmark county, Norway. It is located in the village of Leirbotn. It is one of the churches for the Talvik parish which is part of the Alta prosti (deanery) in the Diocese of Nord-Hålogaland. The white, wooden church was built in a rectangular style in 1993 using plans drawn up by the architect Peer Stockholm. The church seats about 160 people.

History
The old, wooden church was built in 1935. It was consecrated by Bishop Eivind Berggrav. The church had 256 seats and the tower had an onion dome. The old church caught on fire and burned to the ground on 18 June 1990. It was a day of mourning for the village and the congregation. The foundation stone for the new church was laid on 31 January 1993. The new, white, wooden church was completed in the fall of 1993 and it was consecrated on 17 October 1993 by the Bishop Ola Steinholt.

See also
List of churches in Nord-Hålogaland

References

Alta, Norway
Churches in Finnmark
Wooden churches in Norway
20th-century Church of Norway church buildings
Churches completed in 1993
1935 establishments in Norway
Rectangular churches in Norway